The 2020–21 Basketbol Süper Ligi was the 55th season of the Basketbol Süper Ligi, the top-tier level professional club basketball league in Turkey.

The season is the first to be played after the previous season was abandoned due to the COVID-19 pandemic. The previous season was cancelled in May 2020.

Teams
On May 11, 2020, it was declared the previous season was cancelled by Turkish Basketball Federation. Since this season was cancelled, there was no promotion and relegation.

On July 29, 2020, it was announced Sigortam.Net İTÜ (Team has been renamed to Bakırköy Basket after end of last season) has been removed from league by TBF due to financial issues. Instead of them, Petkim Spor will play in the league.
On August 21, 2020 Teksüt Bandırma announced that they withdrew from league due to financial issues. Later on the same day TBF has announced that 2020–21 season will be played with 15 teams. On September 4, 2020, Arbitration Board of Sports decided, application of Merkezefendi Belediyesi Denizli Basket is valid and they could be the 16th team of BSL.

On September 18, TBF announced Fethiye Belediyespor would be the 16th team.

Venues

Personnel and sponsorship

Head coaching changes

Regular season

League table

Positions by round

Results

Playoffs
In the quarter-finals a best-of-three was played, in the semi-finals a best-of-five and in the finals a best-of-seven playoff format was used.

Quarterfinals were played best-of-three format (1-1-1), semifinals and finals were played in a best-of-five format (2-2-1).

Bracket

Quarterfinals

|}

Semifinals

|}

Finals

|}

Statistical leaders

| width=50% valign=top |

Points

|}

|}

| width=50% valign=top |

Assists

 

 
|}

|}Source: BSL Stats

Awards
All official awards of the 2020–21 Basketbol Süper Ligi.

Season awards

MVP of the Round

MVP of the Month

Turkish clubs in European competitions

References

External links
Official Site
TBLStat.net Historical Data

Turkish Basketball Super League seasons
Turkish
1